

Biography

Michael Ward is a Grammy Winning American Guitarist from Minneapolis, MN. A founding member of the early 90’s Alt-Rock band School of Fish on Capitol Records, his unique tone provided the underpinning hook for the Band’s hit single “3 Strange Days” which has been covered by several artists, most recently by Dave Navarro (Janes Addiction) and Tommy Lee (Motley Crue) in a live performance at the Troubadour in Los Angeles. 

Michael’s innovative approach to the guitar has captured the attention of several producers such as Matt Wallace (Faith No More, Maroon 5, Deftones, R.E.M) and Mark Endert (Madonna, Train, Miley Cyrus) leading to over 50 studio album recordings throughout his 35-year career. 

With Matt Wallace, Michael recorded the John Hiatt album Perfectly Good Guitar, including the hit title track. Along with Mark Endert, he recorded the Gavin DeGraw album Chariot, which featured the smash hit “I Don’t Wanna Be.”

In 1995 Michael was approached by Jakob Dylan to join the Wallflowers and record the album Bringing Down the Horse, selling over 5 million copies and earning Michael a Grammy Award for “One Headlight” in the category of Best Rock Performance by a Duo or Group with vocal.

Following the Wallflowers, Michael joined Ben Harper as one of the Innocent Criminals, contributing to Both Sides of The Gun, Lifeline, Call It What It Is, along with Ben Harper and The Blind Boys of Alabama, where he earned an NAACP Image Award for There Will Be A Light.

Michael has played in over 50 countries worldwide. When not touring he resides in Los Angeles, CA, playing as a studio session musician and guitar instructor.

Discography

References

External links
 Life of a Wallflower by Paul Hanson

1967 births
American rock guitarists
American male guitarists
The Wallflowers members
Grammy Award winners
Living people
Gogol Bordello members
Guitarists from Los Angeles
20th-century American guitarists